Stoughton is a village and civil parish in the District of Chichester in West Sussex, England located  north west of Chichester east of the B2146 road, on a lane leading to East Marden.
In the 2001 census 631 people lived in 255 households, of whom 286 were economically active. At the 2011 Census the population including Walderton had increased to 659. The parish is crossed from west to east by the Monarch's Way long-distance footpath, which passes through the villages of Stoughton and Walderton. There is one pub, The Hare and Hounds.

Famous 19th-century cricketer George Brown was born in the village.

The parish church

The church, standing on a hillside overlooking the village, is of late Saxon or early Norman origin.
Built around 1050, the church was restored around 1850.
The Trinity Episcopal Church of Stoughton Massachusetts, USA received a stone from the ribbing in the old church's chancel area as a gift in 1935, presented to then Rector Marshall. It was placed in the floor of the pulpit. The restoration of some of its outer walls was at the behest of Elizabeth Killick, a naval engineer who was the first woman to become a fellow of the Royal Academy of Engineering.

Landmarks
Kingley Vale lies on the border of the parish which is a Site of Special Scientific Interest and a national nature reserve. It is noted for its Yew woodlands. The site is also known for its archaeological interest including the Bronze Age barrow cemetery known as the Devil's Humps, Bronze Age and Roman earthworks, cross dykes, a camp and a field system.

War Memorial

There is a memorial to Pilot Officer Bolesław Własnowolski V.M., K.W., by the side of the path to Kingley Vale, next to the field where his Hurricane crashed in November 1940.

References

External links

Villages in West Sussex